The Tsawwassen Lands is the sole reserve of land that the Tsawwassen First Nation has authority over in British Columbia, Canada, and is located adjacent to the causeway of the Tsawwassen ferry terminal. To the south is the Canada–United States border and on the north is Canoe Pass, an arm of the Fraser River. The First Nation operates a park-and-ride for ferry customers, and also has a residential development housing non-natives called Tsatsu Shores just south of the causeway.

The Tsawwassen Mills mall is located within this area.

See also
Roberts Bank Superport
List of Indian reserves in British Columbia

References

Indian reserves in the Lower Mainland
Delta, British Columbia